Memphis most commonly refers to:

 Memphis, Egypt, a former capital of ancient Egypt
 Memphis, Tennessee, a major American city

Memphis may also refer to:

Places

United States
 Memphis, Alabama
 Memphis, Florida
 Memphis, Indiana
 Memphis, Michigan
 Memphis, Mississippi
 Memphis, Missouri
 Memphis, Nebraska
 Memphis, New York
 Memphis, Ohio
 Memphis metropolitan area, centered on Memphis, Tennessee
 Memphis, Texas

Elsewhere
 Mampsis, Mamshit or Memphis, a Nabatean city

Film
 Memphis (film), a 2013 film directed by Tim Sutton.

Music
 Memphis (band), a musical duo
 Memphis Industries, a record label
 Memphis (musical), a Broadway musical by David Bryan and Joe DiPietro

Albums
 Memphis (Boz Scaggs album), 2013
 Memphis (Roy Orbison album), 1972
 Coin Coin Chapter Four: Memphis, 2019

Songs
 "Memphis, Tennessee" (song) or "Memphis", by Chuck Berry, 1959; covered by many performers
 "Memphis" (The Badloves song), 1994
 "Memphis" (Joe Jackson song), 1983
 "Memphis", by David Nail, 2002
 "Memphis", by Justin Bieber from Journals, 2013
 "Memphis", by White Zombie from Psycho-Head Blowout, 1987

Other uses
 Memphis (mythology), the wife of Epaphus, who was, according to legend, the founder of Memphis, Egypt
 Memphis (genus), a genus of brush-footed butterflies
 Memphis (cigarette), a cigarette brand of Austria Tabak
 Memphis (typeface), a slab-serif typeface designed in 1929 by Dr. Rudolf Wolf
 Memphis Group, an influential design movement of Italian designers and architects in the 1980s
 USS Memphis (CA-10), a US Navy armored cruiser wrecked by a tsunami in 1916
 USS Memphis (SSN-691), a nuclear attack submarine of the United States Navy
 Windows 98, codenamed Memphis during development
 City of Memphis (train), a passenger train route

People with the name
 Memphis Bleek, New York rapper
 Memphis Depay, Dutch footballer
 Randall 'Memphis' Raines, a character in Gone in 60 Seconds
 Ricky Memphis, Italian actor

See also
 
University of Memphis, a public university in Memphis, Tennessee
Memphis Tigers, the athletic programs of the University of Memphis
West Memphis, Arkansas, part of the Memphis, Tennessee, metropolitan area
Memphis La Blusera, an Argentine blues band
Memphis Grizzlies, American professional basketball team based in Memphis, Tennessee
Corporate Memphis, an art style.